Sri Rama Bantu is a 1979 Telugu film starring Chiranjeevi and Mohan Babu.

Cast 
 Chiranjeevi
 Geetha
 Mohan Babu
 Ramana Murthy
 Prabhakar Reddy
 Potti Veeraiah

Soundtrack

Reception

References

External links
 

1979 films
Films scored by Satyam (composer)
1970s Telugu-language films